Hara Kefalidou (born 1965) is a Greek politician from the Movement for Change. She is currently shadow education minister in the Greek Parliament, representing Drama.

References

See also 

 List of members of the Hellenic Parliament, 2019

1965 births
Living people
Movement for Changes politicians

21st-century Greek women politicians
People from Drama, Greece